Subservience is an upcoming sci-fi thriller film directed by S.K. Dale from a screenplay by Will Honley and April Maguire. It stars Megan Fox as a domestic gynoid who develops self-awareness and becomes hostile, and Michele Morrone as its purchaser.

Cast
 Megan Fox
 Michele Morrone
 Madeline Zima
 Andrew Whipp

Production
In December 2022, it was announced Megan Fox and Michele Morrone had joined the cast of Subservience. Subservience sees Fox reteaming with filmmaker Dale, who she previously worked with on the 2021 thriller Till Death. Principal photography began on January 7, 2023, at the Nu Boyana Film Studios in Sofia, Bulgaria. In January 2023, it was announced that Madeline Zima and Andrew Whipp have joined the cast. The same month, the film received a €1 million cash rebate from the Bulgarian National Film Center, amounting to 25% of its total budget.

References

External links
 

American robot films
American science fiction thriller films
Bulgarian thriller films
Android (robot) films
Fictional artificial intelligences
Fictional gynoids
Films about artificial intelligence
Films shot in Bulgaria
Upcoming English-language films
English-language Bulgarian films
Upcoming films